Negübei was a khan of the Chagatai Khanate (1271–1272?). He was the son of Sarban.

In 1271 Negübei was appointed by Kaidu as head of the Chagatai Khanate. A year after his enthronement, however, he rebelled against his master, possibly in conjunction with the revolts launched by the sons of Alghu and Baraq. Kaidu responded by sending an army against Negübei, and the latter was forced to flee to the east. Soon afterward, he was killed and subsequently replaced by Buqa Temür.

1272 deaths
Chagatai khans
13th-century monarchs in Asia
Year of birth unknown